Arribas is a surname.

Notable people with this surname include:

 Alejandro Arribas, Spanish football player for Real Oviedo
 Francisco Gutiérrez Arribas, Spanish sculptor
 Gustavo Arribas, Argentine politician
 Igone Arribas, Spanish rhythmic gymnast
 José Arribas, French football player
 Maritza Arribas Robaina, Cuban chess player
 Miguel Arribas, Puerto Rican politician
 Óscar Arribas, Spanish football player for AD Alcorcón
 Sergio Arribas (footballer, born 1995), Spanish football player for Villarubia CF
 Sergio Arribas (footballer, born 2001), Spanish football player for Real Madrid Castilla